Rock Sound is a British magazine that covers rock music. The magazine aims at being more "underground" and less commercial, while also giving coverage to better-known acts. It generally focuses on pop punk, post-hardcore, metalcore, punk, emo, hardcore, heavy metal and extreme metal genres of rock music, rarely covering indie rock music at all. The tag-line "For those who like their music loud, extreme and non-conformist" is sometimes used. Although primarily aimed at the British market, the magazine is also sold in Australia, Canada and the United States.

History
The British edition of Rock Sound was launched in March 1999 by the French publisher Editions Freeway. The magazine was bought out by its director, Patrick Napier, in December 2004. The magazines offices are in London. Separate titles with the same name have been published under the same umbrella company in France since 1993, and in Spain since 1998.

The magazine is known for including a free CD in most issues, which has tracks from bands' new albums that have not been released as singles. These are now normally called '100% Volume' or 'The Volumes', but in the past compilations were also called 'Music With Attitude', 'Bugging Your Ears!', 'Sound Check' and 'Punk Rawk Explosion'.  Sometimes whole albums are included with the magazine, particularly from bands wanting to gain exposure, including Futures' debut album The Holiday in March 2010, and Burn The Fleet's debut album The Modern Shape in May 2012.

The first issue was published in April 1999. Issue 2 featured British band Reef on the front cover, and later issues 3 and 8 featured Terrorvision and Foo Fighters respectively. In July 2011 a host of "Through The Years" articles were written to celebrate the 150th issue of the magazine. 2017 witnessed the first annual Rock Sound Awards where £1 from every magazine bundle sold was donated to the One More Light Fund in memory of Chester Bennington.

Audience

The magazine had a circulation figure of 15,005 from January to December 2010 auditored by ABC. This includes 10,162 sales in the United Kingdom and Ireland, and 4,843 from Other Countries. The same auditing body said the magazine had a slightly lower circulation figure of 14,227 from January to December 2011, with sales of 10,053 from the United Kingdom and Ireland, and 4,174 from Other Countries. The majority of sales come from newstrade, with some coming from subscriptions.

The main rival to the magazine in Britain is Kerrang! because of the similar types of music both magazines cover.

Album of the Year

At the end of every year the magazine lists their favourite 75 albums released in the previous twelve months.

 1999 – Filter – Title of Record
 2000 – A Perfect Circle – Mer de Noms
 2001 – System of a Down – Toxicity
 2002 – Isis – Oceanic
 2003 – Hell Is for Heroes – The Neon Handshake
 2004 – Isis – Panopticon
 2005 – Coheed and Cambria – Good Apollo, I'm Burning Star IV, Volume One: From Fear Through the Eyes of Madness
 2006 – The Bronx – The Bronx
 2007 – Biffy Clyro – Puzzle
 2008 – Genghis Tron – Board Up the House
 2009 – Mastodon – Crack the Skye
 2010 – Bring Me the Horizon – There Is a Hell Believe Me I've Seen It. There Is a Heaven Let's Keep It a Secret
 2011 – Mastodon – The Hunter
 2012 – The Menzingers – On the Impossible Past
 2013 – letlive – The Blackest Beautiful
 2014 – Lower Than Atlantis – Lower Than Atlantis
 2015 – Bring Me the Horizon – That's the Spirit
 2016 – Panic! at the Disco – Death of a Bachelor
 2017 – All Time Low – Last Young Renegade
 2018 – Twenty One Pilots – Trench
 2019 – Waterparks  Fandom
 2020 – Yungblud - Weird!
 2021 – Twenty One Pilots - Scaled and Icy

Hall of Fame/Throwback

Rock Sound inducted numerous albums into its Hall of Fame, as part of a long-running feature. The main criterion for inclusion was thought to be influence – even within a particular genre – and for that reason many of the albums have been commercially successful as well as critically successful because they have then gone on to influence large numbers of bands or the music scene. Thus this differs from the Yearly Top Albums lists which do not take influence into account. In each article there was normally an interview with band members, a commentary on the album's release, a look at its initial success, and reaction from other musicians or participants in the album's creation - such as producers, engineers, and music video directors. Towards the end of this section's run it was renamed to "Throwback".

Rock Sound Records
In 2019, Rock Sound introduced a new venture titled Rock Sound Records, a sub-brand of Rock Sound offering and distributing music in limited physical formats, such as cassette tapes and vinyl records. Generally, this involves the exclusive physical release of a record released by a band that's signed to a different (major) record label. For instance, the first Rock Sound Records release was a cassette tape version of Simple Creatures′ debut EP Strange Love, while the band is currently signed to BMG.

Discography

See also
 Kerrang!
 NME
 Metal Hammer
 Alternative Press

References
 Citations

Sources

External links
Official website

1999 establishments in the United Kingdom
Monthly magazines published in the United Kingdom
Music magazines published in the United Kingdom
Magazines established in 1999